Kyle Wilson (born 9 June 1989) is a South African former cricketer. He played in five first-class and four List A matches for Border in 2010.

See also
 List of Border representative cricketers

References

External links
 

1989 births
Living people
South African cricketers
Border cricketers
People from Worcester, South Africa
Cricketers from the Western Cape